D37 or D-37 may refer to:

Ships 
 , a Mato Grosso-class destroyer of the Brazilian Navy
 , a Battle-class destroyer of the Royal Australian Navy
 , an Avenger-class aircraft carrier of the Royal Navy
 , a Type 45 destroyer of the Royal Navy
 , a V-Class destroyer of the Royal Navy

Rail transport 
 EMD D37, a traction motor equipping the New South Wales 42 class locomotive
 PRR D37, a Pennsylvania Railroad locomotive

other uses 
 ASTM D37, a testing standard for cannabis
 D-37C, the computer component of the all-inertial NS-17 Missile Guidance Set
 D37D, a Minuteman III intercontinental ballistic missile flight computer
 D37 road (Croatia)
 Queen's Gambit Declined, a chess opening
 Warren Municipal Airport (Minnesota)